Madonna and Child with Saint John the Baptist and Saint Francis is a 1489 oil on panel painting by Cima da Conegliano, now in the Musée du Petit Palais in Avignon.

References

Paintings in Provence-Alpes-Côte d'Azur
1489 paintings
Paintings of the Madonna and Child by Cima da Conegliano
Paintings depicting John the Baptist
Paintings of Francis of Assisi